A women's 20-over cricket tournament at the 2015 Pacific Games in Port Moresby, Papua New Guinea, was held from 6 to 11 July 2015. Played at Amini Park and the Colts Cricket Ground, it will be followed by the men's tournament at the same venues the following week.

Six teams participated in the tournament, two more than in the men's version – at earlier editions of the Pacific Games (previously known as the South Pacific Games), no women's tournament was played. Samoa defeated Papua New Guinea by three runs in the final to win the gold medal, becoming only the second country (after Papua New Guinea) to win a Pacific Games gold medal in cricket. Fiji defeated Vanuatu in a play-off for the bronze medal.

The tournament also served as part of the qualification process for the 2018 World Twenty20 in the West Indies, with the top two teams joining Japan in a tri-series in 2016 to decide the ICC East Asia-Pacific region's representative at the World Twenty20 Qualifier in 2017. Because New Caledonia is not an ICC member, a separate system was used to decide which two teams proceeded. However, the separate system produced the same teams as the regular table.

Preparation
Papua New Guinea and Samoa prepared for the tournament by playing a series in Apia, with PNG also playing matches against the men's under-19 team. As part of an arrangement with ICC East Asia-Pacific, Australia's Melbourne Cricket Club (MCC) toured both Fiji and Vanuatu in May 2015, fielding a mixed men's and women's team in matches against the Fiji and Vanuatu women's national teams. Earlier, in April, Vanuatu had hosted New Caledonia.

Group stage

Finals

Fifth-place playoff

Preliminary final (2nd vs 3rd)

Bronze-medal playoff

Final

Statistics

Most runs
The top five runscorers are included in this table, ranked by runs scored and then by batting average.

Source: CricHQ

Most wickets

The top five wicket takers are listed in this table, ranked by wickets taken and then by bowling average.

Source: CricHQ

Final standings

See also 
 Cricket at the 2015 Pacific Games – Men's tournament

References

External links
 Women's Cricket at XV Pacific Games

Pacific Games, women
Women's cricket in Papua New Guinea

Women's Twenty20 cricket international competitions
2018 ICC Women's World Twenty20
Cricket at the 2015 Pacific Games
2015 in women's cricket